HobbyConsolas is a Spanish video game magazine founded in 1991 by Hobby Press and published by Axel Springer SE. The first issue appeared in October 1990. The monthly magazine offers information about games for all consoles, and since 2012 has also covered video games for PC and mobile devices. In March 2014 it had a circulation of 32,129 copies, and had approximately 330,000 readers. Their official website is the fifth most visited Spanish video game website.

Listeners of the Spanish radio program Game 40 named HobbyConsolas the best game magazine of 1997.

See also
 Micromanía

References

External links
 
Archived HobbyConsolas Magazines on the Internet Archive

Axel Springer SE
1991 establishments in Spain
Magazines established in 1991
Magazines published in Madrid
Monthly magazines published in Spain
Spanish-language magazines
Video game magazines published in Spain